Qualification for 2015 Singapore Super Series badminton competition was held on 7 April 2015.

Men's singles

Seeds

Qualifying draw

First qualifier

Second qualifier

Third qualifier

Fourth qualifier

Women's singles

Seeds

Qualifying draw

First qualifier

Second qualifier

Third qualifier

Fourth qualifier

Men's doubles

Seeds

Qualifying draw

First qualifier

Second qualifier

Third qualifier

Fourth qualifier

Women's doubles

Seeds

Qualifying draw

First qualifier

Second qualifier

Third qualifier

Fourth qualifier

Mixed doubles

Seeds

Qualifying draw

First qualifier

Second qualifier

Third qualifier

Fourth qualifier

References
Original Draw Results
MS Draw Results
WS Draw Results
MD Draw Results
WD Draw Results
XD Draw Results

2015 BWF Super Series
Singapore Open (badminton)